Schrankia capnophanes is a species of moth of the family Erebidae first described by Turner in 1939. It is found on Tasmania in Australia.

References

Moths described in 1939
Hypenodinae